Debbie Amis Bell (1940 – February 5, 2017) was an American Civil Rights activist, SNCC (Student Nonviolent Coordinating Committee) member, and active associate of the Communist Party USA. Bell was a Field Organizer for the SNCC. She is most well known for her work within schools, churches, her community, and Black owned businesses. Debbie Bell was also the head of the Philadelphia Federation of Teachers. Much of her work was carried out in Atlanta, Georgia. However, she was very active in her home state of Pennsylvania as well.

Biography 
Debbie Amis was born in Philadelphia, Pennsylvania, in 1940. Bell died on February 5, 2017, at 77 years old. Debbie is survived by her husband of more than 50 years, David Bell, as well as her two children, Renee Bell & Andrea Bell. Debbie was the oldest of five children born to B.D. Amis and Sophie Sinowitz. Both of her parents were political activists as well as members of the Communist Party USA (CPUSA). This would later be the reason that Bell herself would become affiliated with the (CPUSA) and leader of the party's Philadelphia District. Bell continued to fight for women, workers, equality, justice, socialism, and peace until her passing.

Early life, education, and activism 
Bell graduated from Overbrook High School and had her sights set on becoming a teacher. She chose to go to school in West Chester, PA. At this time, West Chester was a segregated town with very newly segregated schools. The traditional route for African American women with the same aspirations as Bell would have chosen to go to Cheyney State. Bell's reasoning for going to West Chester was simply because West Chester offered classes that she was interested in taking as opposed to other "traditional" schools like Cheyney. When Debbie was a senior in college, the communist party that she was affiliated with had asked her to attend a student Civil Rights conference down south in Raleigh, North Carolina. This conference was none other than the founding conference for the Student Nonviolent Coordinating Committee (SNCC). After the conference had finished Bell knew that she wanted to help contribute. She stated "I was determined to make a difference." Debbie was offered a job as a secretary for the SNCC. She declined stating that she was "not going to accept a traditionally female position." This eventually landed her the position of Community Organizer. She used her skills to help desegregate restaurants in Atlanta, Georgia by partaking in sit-ins and marches through or past these segregated restaurants. Debbie did not disclose her affiliation with the Communist Party to other members of the SNCC. While working for the SNCC, Bell enrolled in a Negro History class at a university in Atlanta. She was inspired to do so after working with the Atlanta Committee on Appeal for Human Rights (ACOAHR). Coming from a school in a predominately white town in PA, Bell was very impressed in how well the SNCC members organized the movement.

Communist Party USA (CPUSA) 
Debbie joined the CPUSA at the early age of 17 years old and was an active member for more than 50 years. The United States was still getting over the "Red Scare" during this time. As you might imagine, most United States Citizens and US officials were not friendly towards Communist Party members. The FBI eventually contacted the SNCC and told them that they had an active communist on their staff. Bell was eventually sent to prison in the midst of an SNCC march. While in jail, Debbie planned a hunger strike in hopes of bringing awareness to the inhumane conditions that herself and other black inmates had to endure in the segregated jail. This landed her a spot in solitary confinement for setting a "bad example". This consisted of a cement room with no bed, no mattress, no sink, and a hole in the floor for bathroom use. She was kept in that cell for three days without any contact except for a trustee who would sneak her pen and paper so that she could write to her parents and let them know that she was okay. During this time, the SNCC had abandoned Debbie. The SNCC did not want a known affiliate of the CPUSA among their ranks. Thankfully, the Communist Party still supported Debbie and even helped get her out of jail. Debbie was eventually released on bail thanks to the CPUSA, who had heard about her imprisonment. After returning to PA, Debbie fought alongside her comrades to end the Vietnam War, the anti apartheid struggle, and the fight to Free Angela.

Later life 
After being released from prison, Debbie was no longer able to work for the SNCC. Leaving them and Atlanta behind, Bell returned to her home state of Pennsylvania. Here she began a career as a teacher in the public school system. As it turns out, the last school that Bell worked for was Overbrook High, her alma mater, where she capped a career as a teacher union activist, serving as the elected union representative. As stated above, Debbie Amis Bell continued to fight for equality, justice, and freedom for all until her passing in 2017. Debbie had no publications of her own; however, more about her experiences can be read in Hands on the Freedom Plow: Personal Accounts by Women in SNCC written by Faith S. Holsaert et al.

References 

1940 births
2017 deaths
American communists
People from Philadelphia